Natan Obed is a Canadian politician who has served as president of the Inuit Tapiriit Kanatami (ITK) since September 2015.

Early life 
Although born in Fredericton, New Brunswick, Obed considers Nain, Nunatsiavut,where he was raised, as his hometown. He moved to Maine as a teenager with his mother after his parents separated.

Obed stayed in the United States for college when he received a scholarship to Tufts University in Boston. He graduated with an English and American Studies degree.

After graduation, he returned to Canada and worked for the Labrador Inuit Association and was Director of Social and Cultural Development for Nunavut Tunngavik Inc., the organization that represents the rights of Nunavut Inuit.

Political career 
In 2008, Obed was a candidate in Nunatsiavut's first presidential election. He was defeated by Jim Lyall.

On September 17, 2015, Obed was elected president of the Inuit Tapiriit Kanatami, a national organization that represents Inuit across Canada. Obed regularly speaks out about issues affecting the Arctic and Inuit community, such as the colonial harm of the Edmonton Eskimos football team's moniker, the poor press coverage of the Prime Minister's apology for the government's role in the mistreatment of Inuit with tuberculosis in the 1940s to 1960s, and the suicide epidemic.

In 2016, he authored a report, "Inuit Priorities for Canada's Climate Strategy: A Canadian Inuit Vision for Our Common Future in Our Homelands", and in 2019 the federal government committed $1 million toward implementing the strategy.

In 2018, Maclean's named him one of five politicians to watch. He currently lives in Iqaluit, Nunavut, with his wife and two sons.

References

Living people
People from Fredericton
People from Nain, Newfoundland and Labrador
Inuit from Newfoundland and Labrador
Year of birth missing (living people)